The 2011–12 UMBC Retrievers men's basketball team represented the University of Maryland, Baltimore County in the 2011–12 NCAA Division I men's basketball season. The team competed in the America East Conference (AEC) and was led by eighth-year head coach Randy Monroe.

References

Umbc
UMBC Retrievers men's basketball seasons
UMBC Retrievers men's basketball team
UMBC Retrievers men's basketball team